Paging Emma is a 1999, English-language film written and directed by Roberto Busó-García. It is set in Puerto Rico.

Plot summary
The film follows Emma Donne, who is left with nothing after witnessing the shooting and abduction of her husband. Lacking family and friends, she immerses herself in the only thing she has left: her work. As an operator at a paging company, Emma is a modern-day messenger. She begins to find solace by living vicariously through the message she relays... and what once was a dreadful chore becomes an obsession for her. Methodically, Emma retreats from the world around her and starts to substitute her basic need for human contact with these meaningless and impersonal messages. After months without a clue about her husband's disappearance, Emma starts receiving personal and intimate messages that only her husband could write. With nothing to lose but her life, Emma gets involved and follows the lead of the mystifying messages. Caught in an ever-widening web of lies and strange coincidences, Emma realizes that events are not always what they seem, as dark secrets about her previous "perfect" life begin to surface.

The 35mm feature film had a theatrical premiere at the Metro Cinema in Santurce, Puerto Rico, on Monday, November 8, 1999. It did not succeed in getting a distributor, and has never been released to the general public.

See also
Cinema of Puerto Rico
List of films set in Puerto Rico

External links
 
 
 
 
 

 Soundtrack CD on Discogs

1999 films
Puerto Rican films
1990s English-language films